Rhigognostis annulatella (ringed diamond-back or annulated smudge) is a moth of the family Plutellidae. It is found in most of Europe.

The wingspan is about 18 mm. The head is whitish, with some dark fuscous hairs. Tuft of palpi very short. Forewings light fuscous, much suffused with whitish - ochreous, with scattered dark fuscous strigulae; an ochreous-whitish dorsal streak from base to tornus, upper edge with triangular projections before and beyond middle, towards base blackish-edged. Hindwings are light grey. The larva is green; spots black, conspicuous; head and 2 black-speckled.

Adults are on wing from July onwards, and overwinter in this stage, occurring on the wing until April.

The larvae feed on Cochlearia officinalis. They feed amongst spun leaves and flowers. The pupal cocoon is formed from a network of silk.

References

External links
Fauna Europaea
UKmoths

Plutellidae
Moths of Europe
Moths described in 1832